MS Seaventure, formerly Bremen, is a cruise ship operated by Hapag-Lloyd Cruises GmbH since 1993. She was built as Frontier Spirit at the Mitsubishi Shipyard, Kobe, Japan, in 1990. 
During a storm in the Southern Atlantic in March 2001, a rogue wave caused heavy damage, even breaking a window on the bridge. It left the ship adrift for two hours without propulsion. A previously uncharted island in the Antarctic was discovered by Bremen in 2003, and was named Bremen Island in 2004. Bremen was also featured in the TV show Killer Waves.

In 2006 she successfully ran the Northwest Passage, helped by satellite images telling where sea ice was.

In July 2018, a crew member shot and killed a polar bear in the Svalbard archipelago. The company claimed that the incident could not have been avoided and was an act of self-defense.

In January 2019 the ship was sold to Scylla AG with a planned handover date of May 2021. In July 2020, Hapag Lloyd Cruises announced that Bremen had been chartered to Havila Kystruten. She was renamed Seaventure in 2020.

References

External links

1990 ships
Cruise ships
Ships built by Mitsubishi Heavy Industries
Rogue wave incidents
Maritime incidents in 2001